Mykhailo Mykhailovych Romanchuk (born 7 August 1996, Rivne, Ukraine) is a Ukrainian swimmer.

Career
At the Singapore World Cup leg in October 2016, he set a world cup record of 14:15.49 in the 1500 meter freestyle (short course), breaking the previous record by over 12 seconds. He holds several distance freestyle national records and the current olympic record in the 800-meter freestyle.

In the Autumn of 2019, he was member of the inaugural International Swimming League swimming for the Energy Standard, who won the team title in Las Vegas, Nevada, in December.

On 27 July 2021, he set a record for Ukraine with a result of 7:41.28 and reached the final of the 800 meters freestyle at the  Tokyo Olympics. Romanchuk reached the final with the best result.

Personal life 

His wife is Ukrainian long jumper Maryna Bekh-Romanchuk.

References

External links

1996 births
Living people
Ukrainian male freestyle swimmers
Sportspeople from Rivne
Swimmers at the 2014 Summer Youth Olympics
Olympic swimmers of Ukraine
Swimmers at the 2016 Summer Olympics
Swimmers at the 2020 Summer Olympics
World Aquatics Championships medalists in swimming
Universiade medalists in swimming
European Aquatics Championships medalists in swimming
Universiade gold medalists for Ukraine
Universiade silver medalists for Ukraine
Youth Olympic gold medalists for Ukraine
Medalists at the 2017 Summer Universiade
Medalists at the 2020 Summer Olympics
Olympic bronze medalists in swimming
Olympic bronze medalists for Ukraine
Laureates of the Prize of the Cabinet of Ministers of Ukraine for special achievements of youth in the development of Ukraine
World Aquatics Championships medalists in open water swimming
21st-century Ukrainian people